High Television (also known as HiTV) was Entertainment Highway's multi-channel digital satellite television service in Nigeria, launched in 2007. It used Hypercable Digital Terrestrial technology  and launched Direct to Home (DTH) Satellite technology on the August 1, 2007.

HiTV later broadcast its material only on satellite at the price of N3,500 ($27.73) monthly. It was the first television platform in Africa to deploy Hypercable, a terrestrial pay-per-view TV decoder system.

HiTV services were stopped in November 2011 due to financial difficulties. The company no longer exists.but now exist in some area providing entertainment to users

See also 
List of satellite television service providers in Nigeria

References 

Hypercable Case Studies
 Hi-TV tackles DStv with Naija-centric channels  
HiTV win Nigeria Pay TV rights
DStv welcomes HiTV
HiTV adds new channels to its bouquet.
HiTV to provide satellite-broadcasting services on NigComSat Platform
Add FTA channels on HiTV

Satellite television
Defunct companies based in Lagos
2007 establishments in Nigeria